Metz Aghbak Armenian: Աղբակ Մեծ is a district of Vaspurakan province of Western Armenia. Its main town was known as Adamamert aka Hadamakert (meaning: city of Adam). This town corresponds to modern Başkale in the east of modern Turkey.

Western Armenia
Former regions of Armenia